Sonor may refer to:

Luc Sonor
Sonor (album)
SONOR Ensemble
Sonorism
Visi-sonor

See also
Sonar (disambiguation)